9344 Klopstock, provisional designation , is a background asteroid from the inner regions of the asteroid belt. It was discovered on 12 September 1991, by German astronomers Freimut Börngen and Lutz Schmadel at the Karl Schwarzschild Observatory in Tautenburg, Germany. It has a rotation period of 5.84 hours and was named after German poet Friedrich Gottlieb Klopstock.

Orbit and classification 

Klopstock is a non-family asteroid of the main belt's background population when applying the hierarchical clustering method to its proper orbital elements. Based on osculating Keplerian orbital elements, the asteroid has also been classified as a member of the Vesta family, one of the largest asteroid families of bright asteroids in the main-belt.

It orbits the Sun in the inner main-belt at a distance of 2.2–2.6 AU once every 3 years and 8 months (1,328 days; semi-major axis of 2.36 AU). Its orbit has an eccentricity of 0.09 and an inclination of 5° with respect to the ecliptic. The body's observation arc begins with its official discovery observation at Tautenburg in September 1991.

Physical characteristics 

Klopstock is an assumed, stony S-type asteroid, a spectral type contrary to the outstandingly low IRAS albedo (see below).

Rotation period 

In September 2013, a rotational lightcurve of Klopstock was obtained from photometric observations in the R-band by astronomers at the Palomar Transient Factory in California. Lightcurve analysis gave a rotation period of 5.842 hours with a brightness amplitude of 0.38 magnitude.

Diameter and albedo 

According to the survey carried out by the Infrared Astronomical Satellite (IRAS) in the 1980s, Klopstock measures 17.05 kilometers in diameter and its surface has an exceptionally low albedo of 0.0116. This would make it one of the darkest asteroid known to exist. However, the result is derived from two IRAS-observations only. The Collaborative Asteroid Lightcurve Link disregards the IRAS-data and assumes a standard albedo for a stony asteroid of 0.20 and consequently calculates a smaller diameter of 3.66 kilometers based on an absolute magnitude of 14.55.

Naming 

This minor planet was named after German poet Friedrich Gottlieb Klopstock (1724–1803), an important figure in the literary style called Empfindsamkeit. The official naming citation was published by the Minor Planet Center on 2 February 1999.

References

External links 
 Asteroid Lightcurve Database (LCDB), query form (info )
 Dictionary of Minor Planet Names, Google books
 Discovery Circumstances: Numbered Minor Planets (5001)-(10000) – Minor Planet Center
 
 

009344
Discoveries by Freimut Börngen
Discoveries by Lutz D. Schmadel
Named minor planets
19910912